Mesoscia eriophora is a moth of the Megalopygidae family. It was described by Sepp in 1848.

References

Moths described in 1848
Megalopygidae